Yehh Jaadu Hai Jinn Ka! ( This magic is of the jinn!) (international title: a magical love story) is an Indian fantasy drama television series that aired from 14 October 2019 to 14 November 2020 on Star Plus. Produced by Gul Khan and Karishma Jain, it starred Vikram Singh Chauhan and Aditi Sharma.

Plot
Aman Junaid Khan and Roshni Ahmed are poles apart, different paths but one destination. Their lives are connected in the most extraordinary way, through fate and magic.

Aman Junaid Khan is a Nawab who is cursed by the Dark Shadow of a Djinn. Roshni, the daughter of a Tawaif, is an Ayaana (A girl with the heart of an angel). Aman's family wants him to marry an ayaana, they arrange his marriage with a girl named Adaa, whom they are mistaken to be an Ayaana because whenever they test her Roshni enters the house making Adaa pass the tests when it is Roshni who did. Parveen's (Aman's mother) life falls in danger because of the Jinn's magic and can be protected only if Aman marries an Ayaana thus revealing that Adaa is not an Ayaana. Salma (Roshni's Mother)  pretends to be sick, forcing Roshni to marry Aman for money. Aman misunderstands Roshni to be a woman with ill intentions who will do anything for money. He detests her and gives her a cheque for marrying him. Aman and Roshni marry.

Roshni feels a connection with Aman but is hurt by his rude behaviour towards her owing to the misunderstanding that occurred. Later she falls in love with Aman, but he continues to dislike and insult her. Because of some misconceptions, Aman throws her out of his house and his life. Aman's brother, Kabir Junaid Khan, makes his entry. He tries to kill Aman, but to save Aman, Roshni takes the arrows herself and dies. Aman realises his deep love for Roshni after her death and is left heartbroken and guilty for always misunderstanding her.

Kabir brings Roshni back to life but keeps her under his control, aiming to separate her from Aman. He erases all her memories with Aman. Kabir's hold on Roshni is destroyed when Aman stabs her with a magical dagger. Then Roshni regains her memory. Parveen is revealed to be evil who wants to use her sons to become the queen of jinns. Parveen kills Kabir but cannot kill Aman. Aman unintentionally touches a mighty sword and becomes 'Jinnat ka Badshah', the new most potent in the dark world. Aman and Roshni enjoy their life together.

Aliya, Aman's ex-girlfriend, returns with a baby and tries to separate Aman and Roshni. The baby is revealed to be Kabir's, and Aliya is revealed to be an Evil ayaana. Parveen tries to sacrifice the baby to regain her lost powers, but Aman saves the child with Roshni's help. Roshni tries to expose Aliya but fails. Aliya attacks Parveen resulting in Parveen going into a coma. Aman, believing it is Roshni's fault throw her out of the house.

One year later

Roshni opens a bakery while Aman is worried about Parveen's decreased health conditions. Despite their differences, Aman and Roshni again become close. Kabir returns. Aman gets stabbed while saving Roshni and becomes physically and emotionally weak. His genuine feelings for Roshni come out. In that intoxicated form only , they consummate their marriage after a year. Kabir makes Aman and Roshni break the Laal Chand, which annoys the Red Moon Princess, Laila. Laila had a twin sister Chandni who is good. Kabir joins hands with Laila and helps her seek revenge against Aman and Roshni.  Chandni helps Aman by giving clues that Roshni is pregnant with twins which Roshni don't know. Chandni saves Aman's family from Laila's evil intentions. Later, Roshni stabs Laila to death. Before dying, Laila curses Roshni that she will die before the next moonrise. Aman races against time and succeeds in saving Roshni but temporarily.

(Season - 2)

The red moon soldier attacks Roshni, and she loses one of her unborn child and Aman. But the family thinks that the loss is of two babies. However, Roshni fights destiny and brings back Aman. She meets Aman's maternal cousin, Rehan Ahmad Khan, a jinn, to help her in this war. After a failed attempt, she strikes a deal with Kala Jinn to give her firstborn child instead of Aman's life.
Roshni hides this from Aman and the family till she finds a solution.  
Soon Roshni find that she is pregnant with twins and one baby is alive and another baby dies in a red moon soldier attack.

Here Rubina's niece Shayari appears. While Rehan, Aman's maternal cousin, finds trouble being targeted by a Jinn Shikari, unaware that it was his girlfriend, Natasha. He suspected Shayari, who was later revealed to be another Jinn Shikari but not a danger for Rehan. Rehan wanted to find his brother and decided to get engaged with Natasha. He accidentally gets engaged with Shayari, who became furious after this but agreed to help them after Aman requested her. To save her child, Roshni decided to surrogate it to a girl with Tabeezi, But Roshni changes her decision as Kala Jinn threatens her to kill Aman if she breaks her promise. Aman captivates Kala Jinn for their child's safety. Roshni helps Aman do the task but later releases Kala Jinn from captivity to keep her promise. Aman finds this out and tricks Roshni to make her reveal the truth. After learning the truth, Aman was heartbroken. Roshni leaves Junaid Manzil to make him feel better, but he brings Roshni back.

Meanwhile, Rehan takes an arrow on his chest to save Shayari, saving her life from the deadly attack. Later on, Shayari's truth is revealed, and a furious Rehan breaks their engagement.

Ayana, the ancient warrior princess, comes to help Roshni save her child. She helps them trick Kala Jinn by giving a fake child while Roshni safely delivers her baby in the Ayanaa Corner. After learning this, Kala Jinn imprisoned Roshni and Armaan (Aman and Roshni's baby) in a cave. Aman was successful in saving Roshni and Armaan, but Kala Jinn found out. Aman agreed to Kala Jinn that they would find his actual name to save Armaan. Kala Jinn told them they could find his name after completing the three tasks.

Rehan and Shayari also decide to help the khans and go on a mission to find Kaala jinn's name. Kaala Jinn, to defeat the Khans, sends Aman and Roshni's first child (who was killed by the red moon's arrow) as the third challenge. However, the Khans win over the baby's spirit (lovingly called baby rooh) with their unconditional love for it. After receiving the three clues, Aman and Roshni find the name when Rehan and Shayari discovered that whoever takes Kala Jinn's name dies immediately. Kala Jinn comes to the mansion and asks them to tell them his name. Roshni bursts out his name to save her child, shocking everyone, but her first child's spirit held her. Kala Jinn does not accept failure and challenges them to fight him. It is revealed that Armaan, being the son of Jinnad Ke Badshah and Ayaana, will end Kaala Jinn. Roshni, Aman, Rehan, and Shayari go on a quest to end kafala jinn, and Armaan finally kills the danger that troubled his family for many years. This quest brought Rehan and Shayari closer and reinforced their trust in each other.

Later, after several other incidents, it is revealed that Tabeezi (Rubina), was an Ayaana earlier and wants her Angelic-heart back from Roshni and that Natasha was involved with her. It is also revealed that Roshni is Tabeezi's brother, Mansoor Ahmed Choudhary's daughter, and is the original owner of Junaid Manzil and Tabeezi's niece.

Roshni was devastated to learn this and promised to give her heart to Tabeezi but made her promise that she wouldn't hurt her family before The Night of the Golden Sun. But Tabeezi continued trying to hurt her and her family. Meanwhile, Rehan and Shayari try to help the family by searching for the Ilm e Jin book, which would solve their doubts. To get answers, Rehan has to concentrate on his doubts, but all he can concentrate is on Shayari. This makes Rehan realise that he's madly in love with her. On the other hand, Roshni decides not to give her heart to Tabeezi and refuses to keep her promise, making Tabeezi furious.

Roshni again becomes pregnant. On the other hand, Rehan and Shayari are kidnapped and held captive, and Shayari is suffocated. Rehan breaks down on seeing this. Later they manage to remain alive. Rehan is unable to confess his love, but Shayari understands.

On the night of the Golden Sun, she traps the entire Khan family in danger. Rehan and Shayri save them using their powers. Aman and Roshni lose their powers but are protected by Armaan's powers. Finally, with the help of the magical ring given by Roshni's mother's soul to her, they defeat Tabeezi, and she is taken away by two other Ayaanas from Ayaana Kumbh.

While the Khan family celebrates with joy that now all the problems from their lives are gone, they can live happily. Shayari confesses her feelings for Rehan, and they hug each other. Aman asks Roshni where the angelic heart went. Roshni asks him not to think about it as now problems are over, and they can lead a simple and happy life forever. The Angelic-heart is revealed to be with Aman and Roshni's child, who is inside her womb.

Cast

Main
 Vikram Singh Chauhan as Aman Junaid Khan: Parveen and Junaid's son; Kabir, Sara and Saima's brother; Farah's half brother; Armaan and Ayan's father (2019–2020)
 Aditi Sharma as Roshni Ahmed Khan: Salma's adopted daughter; Shayari's cousin,Aman's wife; Armaan and Ayan's mother (2019-2020)
Shehzada Dhami as Rehan Ahmed Khan, Nasreen's son, Aman's maternal cousin, Mahira and Farhan's brother, Shayari's love interest (2020)
Shruti Sharma as Shayari Choudhary, Roshni's cousin, Rehan's love interest and secretary (2020)

Recurring
 Smita Bansal as Parveen Junaid Khan: Former Sifrati Jinn, Nasreen's sister; Junaid's first wife; Kabir, Aman, Sara and Saima's mother (2019–2020)
 Sushant Singh as Junaid Khan: Anjum's son; Baby's brother; Parveen and Rubina's husband; Kabir, Aman, Sara, Saima and Farah's father (2019–2020)
 Garima Vikrant Singh as Salma Janesaar: A Tawaif; Roshni's adoptive mother (2019–2020)
 Jaswinder Gardner as Rubina Khan "Tabeezi" : Junaid's second wife; Farah's mother; Roshni and Shayari's Aunt. Aman, Sara and Saima's stepmother; Khan family's ex-helper; an ex-Ayaana (2019–2020)
 Arhaan Behll as Kabir Junaid Khan: Sifriti Jinn; later Zehraal; Parveen and Junaid's son; Aman, Sara and Saima's brother; Farah's half-brother; Aliya's husband and  Aamir's father (2019–2020)
 Vaibhavi Kapoor as Sara Junaid Khan: Parveen and Junaid's daughter; Kabir, Aman and Saima's sister; Farah's half-sister (2019–2020)
 Gouri Agarwal as Saima Junaid Khan: Parveen and Junaid's daughter; Kabir, Aman, Sara's sister; Farah's half-sister, Aftab's wife (2019–2020)
 Saloni Daini as Farah Junaid Khan: Rubina and Junaid's daughter; Kabir, Aman, Sara and Saima's half-sister (2019–2020)
 Richa Bhattacharya as Anjum Khan: Baby and Junaid's mother; Kabir, Aman, Sara, Saima and Farah's grandmother (2019–2020)
 Seema Azmi as Baby Khan: Anjum's daughter; Junaid's sister; Farah, Kabir, Aman, Sara and Saima's aunt (2019–2020)
 Ayansh Mishra as Mr. Chotu: Soha's son; Khan family's adopted child (2019–2020)
 Aamir S Khan as Imran: Aman, Sara, Saima, and Kabir's cousin (2020)
 Ashita Dhawan as Nasreen Ahmed Khan: Sifrati Jinn; Rehan, Farhan and Mahira's mother; Parveen's sister (2020)
 Prabhat Choudhary as Farhan Ahmed Khan: Nasreen's son, Mahira and Rehan's brother (2020)
 Solanki Sharma as Mahira Ahmed Khan: Nasreen's daughter; Rehan and Farhan's sister (2020)
 Himani Sahani as Natasha: Jinn Shikari; Rehan's evil girlfriend (2020)
 Sanjana Singh as Adaa Rizvi: Aman's former fiancée (2019)
 Massheuddin Qureshi as Mr. Rizvi: Adaa's father (2019)
 Anushka Singh as Mrs. Rizvi: Adaa's mother (2019)
 Rupesh Kataria as Sameer: Roshni's former fiancé (2019)
 Surbhi Jyoti as 
Laila: Chandni's twin sister; Red Moon Princess (2020)
 Chandni: Laila's twin sister; Red Moon Princess (2020)
 Rajshri Rani as Huma: Sameer's wife (2019)
 Sreejita De as Aliya: Haiwana; Aman's ex-girlfriend; Kabir's wife; Aamir's mother (2020)
 Krishvi Bhanushali as Aamir Khan: Aliya and Kabir's son (2020)
 Saloni Chauhan as Raakh Jinn: Kabir's helper (2019)
 Zubeida Verma as ChunBun: Spider Jinn (2020)
 Pranav Kumar as Jaadugar Jinn: A magician (2020)
 Shefali Mahida as Aman's sword (2020)
 Shraddha Tiwari as Shola Jinn: A dragon (2020)
 Simran Arora as Jalpari Jinn (2020)
 Subhan Khan as Jhumru:             laal Jinn (2020)
 Shaurya Shah as Young Aman Junaid Khan: Parveen and Junaid's son (2019; 2020)

Production

Development
The show was launched at Saif Ali Khan and Kareena Kapoor's Pataudi Palace, becoming the first television show to be launched at the Pataudi Palace. It initially was titled as Raaz Mahal but later changed its title to Yehh Jadu Hai Jinn Ka. It was originally planned to be a weekend show. However, it was later aired through weekdays.

Saloni Daini, who played Farah Khan narrated the first few episodes and was the voiceover artist for the promos of the series. In September 2020, the series received extension till December 2020 but went off air in November 2020 due to low ratings.

Casting
Actress Aditi Sharma was selected to play Roshni Ahmed's character. Leenesh Mattoo was first approached to play Aman Junaid Khan opposite Sharma, but was replaced by Vikram Singh Chauhan.

In December 2019, Arhaan Behll joined the cast as Kabir Junaid Khan. In March 2020, Surbhi Jyoti was cast as the Red moon princess Laila/Chandni for few episodes cameo. In June 2020, Shruti Sharma and Shehzada Dhami were cast as Shayari Choudhary and Rehan Ahmed Khan, respectively.

After the shootings of television shows resumed after lockdown in late June 2020, several actors of the show such as - Smita Bansal, Arhaan Behll, Saloni Daini, Aamir Salim Khan and child actor Ayansh Mishra had to exit the show as limited crew and cast members were allowed on shootings as per government guidelines.

Broadcast
The production and airing of the show was halted indefinitely in late March 2020 due to the COVID-19 outbreak in India. Because of the outbreak, the filming of television series and films was halted on 19 March 2020 and expected to resume on 1 April 2020 but could not and the series was last broadcast on 27 March 2020 when the remaining episodes were aired. The filming of the series resumed after more than three months in early July and the broadcast resumed on 27 July 2020.

Cancellation 
After the ratings dropped, post the shootings and broadcasting of television shows resumed in India during July 2020 after COVID-19 lockdown, the producer decided to off-air the show in November 2020 cancelling its extension.

Soundtrack

Yehh Jadu Hai Jinn Ka 's soundtrack is written by Divy Nidhi Sharma and composed by Sanjeev Srivastava. "Kahani Hamari Fasana Hamara", the show's theme song is sung by Pamela Jain and Bhaven Dhanak.

References

External links
 
 Yehh Jadu Hai Jinn Ka! on Hotstar

 hindi shayari
 Husband Wife Best Love Shayari in hindi 
 Shayari Hindi
 Love WhatsApp Status All India Sk Video

Indian fantasy television series
2019 Indian television series debuts
Hindi-language television shows
Indian drama television series
StarPlus original programming
Television shows set in Mumbai
Television series by 4 Lions Films
Indian horror fiction television series
Indian supernatural television series
Jinn in popular culture